Munz may refer to:

People
 Bernhard Münz (1856–1919), Austrian philosopher and librarian
 Peter Munz (1921–2006), German-New Zealander philosopher and historian
 Philip A. Munz (1892-1974), U.S. botanist, taxonomist and educator 
 Mieczysław Munz (1900–1976), Polish-U.S. pianist
 Moses Münz (–1831), Hungarian rabbi

Other
 Maritime Union of New Zealand (MUNZ), a trade union in New Zealand
 Munz, a chocolate brand owned by Maestrani

See also
 Muntz (disambiguation)
 Müntz (disambiguation)
 Minz
 Mintz

Germanic-language surnames
Jewish surnames